Bego Ćatić (born 14 May 1963) is a former Bosnian footballer who played in the former Yugoslavia and Turkey.

Playing career 
Born in Bijeljina, Ćatić started playing football for local side FK Radnik Bijeljina in the Yugoslav Second League. He would also join fellow Second League side HNK Šibenik.

In 1989, Ćatić moved to Turkey, joining Süper Lig side Zeytinburnuspor for two seasons. He made 59 leagues appearances for the club.

He retired from professional football in 1991, and moved to Germany to play amateur football. He spent several seasons with Türkiyemspor Berlin, helping the club reach the regionalliga in 1994.

Managerial career
In 2006, Ćatić became a manager of German Oberliga side FC Anker Wismar.

References

External links 
 EX YU Fudbalska Statistika po godinama
 

1963 births
Living people
People from Bijeljina
Association football defenders
Yugoslav footballers
Bosnia and Herzegovina footballers
FK Radnik Bijeljina players
HNK Šibenik players
Zeytinburnuspor footballers
Türkiyemspor Berlin players
Yugoslav Second League players
Süper Lig players
Yugoslav expatriate footballers
Expatriate footballers in Turkey
Yugoslav expatriate sportspeople in Turkey
Bosnia and Herzegovina expatriate footballers
Bosnia and Herzegovina expatriate sportspeople in Turkey
Expatriate footballers in Germany
Bosnia and Herzegovina expatriate sportspeople in Germany
Bosnia and Herzegovina football managers